Lekso Kaulashvili (born August 27, 1992) is a Georgian rugby union player, who plays as a tighthead prop for French Top 14 club Bordeaux Bègles and the Georgia national team.

References

External links
 Union Bordeaux Bègles
 EPCR
 All.Rugby
 It's Rugby

1992 births
Living people
Rugby union players from Tbilisi
Rugby union props
Stade Rochelais players
Union Bordeaux Bègles players
Georgia international rugby union players
Expatriate rugby union players from Georgia (country)
Expatriate rugby union players in France
Expatriate sportspeople from Georgia (country) in France